Salway Ash (also spelt Salwayash) is a village in Dorset, England. Holy Trinity Church was built there in 1887–89.

References

Villages in Dorset